The FIS Nordic World Ski Championships 1980 in cross-country skiing took place in Falun, Sweden on 8 March 1980. This was an extraordinary event because the women's 20 km event was not held at the Winter Olympics in Lake Placid.

Women's 20 km 
March 8, 1980

<div>
Venue: Falun, Sweden

Medal table

References
List of FIS Nordic WSC Women's 20 km champions: 1978-87

FIS Nordic World Ski Championships
1980 in sports
1980 in Swedish sport
1980 in Nordic combined
March 1980 sports events in Europe
Nordic skiing competitions in Sweden
Sports competitions in Falun